Amanda du-Pont (born 26 June 1988) is a Swazi-born South African actress, model and television host. Du-Pont is known for her portrayal of Senna in the CW drama series Life is Wild and Sharon in the SABC 3 comedy-drama Taryn & Sharon. Currently, she stars as Ashley in the Netflix thriller series Shadow. She is known for acting on the SABC 1 soap opera Skeem Saam as Nompumelelo 'Lelo' Mthiyane.

Early life
Du-Pont was born on 26 June 1988 in Manzini, Swaziland. She is of French, Italian, Portuguese and Swazi ancestry. She was born and raised in Manzini  and lived with her cousin Alulutho Du Pont, also Swati. Later they moved to Mpumalanga to finish their schooling at Uplands College.

Career
Du-Pont had a leading role in the 2014 feature film Between Friends, and a recurring role in the hit South African television program Skeem Saam. From 2012 to 2016 she was the co-host of SABC 1 celebrity lifestyle magazine shows Real Goboza, alongside Phat Joe. She has starred in the CW drama Life is Wild, SABC 2's Muvhango, Intersexions, Generations, Mzanzi TV's Loxion Bioscopeseries, and the 2015 feature film Hear Me Move. In February 2019, it was announced that Du-Pont would star in the Netflix thriller series Shadow.

Education
In 2011, Du-Pont was awarded a Bachelor of Arts degree from the South African School of Motion Picture and Live Performance in Johannesburg. The next year, she graduated from the New York Film Academy in New York City, where she was awarded a full scholarship for scholastic excellence.

Awards 
At the age of 21, Du-Pont was awarded a Lifetime Achievement award by Swaziland's Department of Arts & Culture for her early achievements in film and television and her promotion of the Swazi language and culture.

Personal life
Du-Pont married Shawn Rodriques in 2020. The couple divorced in January 2023.

Filmography

References

External links 

 

1988 births
Living people
South African television actresses
South African people of French descent
South African people of Portuguese descent
South African people of Chinese descent
Swazi emigrants to South Africa
Coloured South African people
People from Manzini
21st-century South African actresses
South African film actresses
New York Film Academy alumni